Mayo is a British television detective fiction-comedy series, adapted from the Gil Mayo Mysteries series books by Marjorie Eccles, first broadcast on BBC One on 12 March 2006. The eight-part series, produced by BBC Birmingham, starred Alistair McGowan as the titular character, alongside Jessica Oyelowo, Huw Rhys and Louise Brealey. The series was developed by Simon Booker, and directed by Metin Huseyin, Jonathan Fox Bassett and Fraser MacDonald.

The series was filmed on location in and around Leamington Spa. Each of the eight episodes were based upon one of Eccles' novels, aside from the final episode, which was an original story for television by Joe Ainsworth. McGowan provided additional script dialogue for all eight episodes, and was also heavily involved in helping produce the series. Notable guest stars throughout the series run included former Doctor Who Sylvester McCoy and actress and singer Paloma Faith.

Cast
 Alistair McGowan as Detective Inspector Gil Mayo
 Jessica Oyelowo as Detective Sergeant Alex Jones
 Huw Rhys as Detective Constable Martin Kite
 Louise Brealey as SOCO Harriet 'Anorak' Tate
 Lucy Evans as Julie Mayo

Broadcast
The series aired at 20:00 on Sundays, with the first episode drawing almost 4.5 million viewers. Across the series, no further viewing figures were recorded. The series broadcast in Australia on ABC1 in mid-2008, and was repeated on 7Two in 2011, under the pseudonym The Gil Mayo Mysteries.

On 23 March 2007 McGowan confirmed that Mayo would not return for a second series. McGowan commented on the series axing; "It was taking its time to find its feet, and by the end, we knew what we were doing. But sadly, decisions are made on the first episode, and we definitely didn't hit the ground running. We learnt how to make a very good programme and we were all really surprised and very disappointed that we didn't get another series. It is sad."

Episodes

References

External links
 

2000s British drama television series
2006 British television series debuts
2006 British television series endings
BBC television dramas
Detective television series
English-language television shows